Sohit Vijay Soni is an Indian television actor, comedian, anchor and concept writer who has appeared in TV shows including Tenali Rama, Bhabiji Ghar Par Hain!, Dahleez, Jijaji Chhat Per Hain and Tu Mera Hero.

Early life and career
Soni hails from Faridabad and he lives in Mumbai.

He started his career with a television serial called Tu Mera Hero. As Funny Character Name was Hero This serial aired on Star Plus from 2015. After this he got work in many major serials, including Tenali Rama, Bhabiji Ghar Par Hain!, Jijaji Chhat Per Hain, May I Come In Madam?.

Filmography

Films and webseries

Television

References

External links

Living people
Indian male television actors
Male actors in Hindi television
People from Faridabad
Year of birth missing (living people)